Ancita paravaricornis is a species of beetle in the family Cerambycidae. It was described by Stephan von Breuning in 1968. It is known from Australia.

References

Ancita
Beetles described in 1968